is a Japanese voice actor. He is currently affiliated with Remax. He has Vietnamese ancestry.

Filmography

Anime
Azusa, Otetsudai Shimasu! as Harumaki Shunpei
Battle B-Daman: Fire Spirits as Grey Michael Vincent
Bedaman as Grey Michael Vincent
Beyblade as DJ (ep 29); Engineer A; Yamashita Cane
Black Butler: Book of Circus as PeterD.C. ~Da Capo~ as Jun'ichi AsakuraD.C.S.S. ~Da Capo Second Season~ as Jun'ichi AsakuraE's Otherwise as Kai KudouEf: A Tale of Memories. as Kyōsuke TsutsumiElfen Lied as GuardFruits Basket as Boy 3 (ep 10); Boy 7 (ep 7); Freshman 2 (ep 13); Man L (ep 3); Student (ep 14)Fushigiboshi no Futago Hime as Tabii (ep 4)Ghost Hunt as Kazuya ShibuyaGift ~eternal rainbow~ as Haruhiko AmamiGreen Green as Male StudentHyōka as Takeo KatsutaInazuma Eleven Go as Kariya Masaki Inazuma Eleven GO: Chrono Stone as Kariya Masaki, Matchos and GammaInazuma Eleven GO: Galaxy as Tetsukado ShinJuusou Kikou Dancouga Nova as Johnny BurnetteJyūshin Enbu - Hero Tales as HyōseiKoi Koi Seven as Tetsurou TanakaLe Chevalier D'Eon as D'Eon de BeaumontLove All Play as Ren MiyagiMobile Suit Gundam Seed Destiny as Chen Jian YiMobile Suit Gundam Seed Destiny Special Edition as Chen Jian YiNaruto: Shippuden as Hashirama Senju (Child), Watase (ep 281)Paranoia Agent (ep 2)Please Twins! as AndoPrism Ark as Acty AxelRyūsei no Rockman Tribe as Burai (Solo/Rogue)School Rumble as Nara KentarouSchool Rumble Nigakki as Masaaki Mitsui; Nara KentarouSchool Rumble OVA Ichigakki Hoshu as Kentarō NaraShadow Star Narutaru as Ishida (ep 11); Pilot B (ep 7)Sonic X as Leon (eps 68,72)Spiral as Male StudentSuper Robot Wars Original Generation as Cobray GordonTouken Ranbu as Souza SamonjiTouken Ranbu as Taroutachi
Touken Ranbu: Hanamaru 2 as Souza Samonji; Taroutachi
Tweeny Witches as Lennon
Ultimate Girls as Makoto Moroboshi
Yumeria as Baker-san (ep 8); Male Student B (ep1); Student (ep2-3)

Video games
Last Escort 2 as Issei Amane
Mugen Souls as Elka
Puyo Puyo Tetris, Puyo Puyo Tetris 2 as Ai
Record of Agarest War 2 as Faz/Fasty
Rockman ZX Advent as Helios (Aeolus)
3rd Super Robot Wars Alpha: To the End of the Galaxy as Cobray Gordon
Super Robot Wars series as Johnny Burnette
Touken Ranbu as Souza Samonji
Touken Ranbu as Taroutachi
Sonic Lost World as Zor

References

External links
Yūki Tai's personal website 
Yūki Tai's profile at Genki Project's website 
Yūki Tai at GamePlaza-Haruka Voice Acting Database 
Yūki Tai at Hitoshi Doi's Seiyuu Database

1977 births
Living people
Japanese male voice actors
Japanese people of Vietnamese descent
Male voice actors from Tokyo